Nowe Chechło  (German Neu Chechlau) is a village in the administrative district of Gmina Świerklaniec, within Tarnowskie Góry County, Silesian Voivodeship, in southern Poland.

The village has a population of 1,300.

References

Villages in Tarnowskie Góry County